Church Hill is an unincorporated community in Marion County, in the U.S. state of Georgia.

History
Church Hill was named for the churches near the original town site.

References

Unincorporated communities in Marion County, Georgia